Ingram Ridge is an unincorporated community in Pemiscot County, in the U.S. state of Missouri.

History
Ingram Ridge derives its name from G. A. Ingram, the original owner of the town site. The small community once had a church, and a cemetery. It is located in the eastern part of the Pascola township.

References

Unincorporated communities in Pemiscot County, Missouri
Unincorporated communities in Missouri